Annet Negesa (born 24 April 1992) is a Ugandan former middle-distance runner who specialised in the 800 metres. She broke Ugandan national records in the 800 m and the 1500 metres as a teenager and was a three-time national champion at the Ugandan Athletics Championships. She represented her country at the 2011 World Championships in Athletics and was the 800 m gold medallist at the 2011 All-Africa Games.

As a junior (under-20) athlete, she won a team bronze medal at the 2010 IAAF World Cross Country Championships, an 800 m bronze at the 2010 World Junior Championships in Athletics, and two gold medals at the 2011 African Junior Athletics Championships. She was named 2011 Athlete of the Year by Uganda Athletics Federation.

Negesa has an XY difference of sex development which results in high levels of testosterone in her body. Under rules set by the International Association of Athletics Federations (IAAF), she had to reduce her testosterone levels in order to compete in the women's category. Negesa said the purpose of the surgery had been misrepresented to her, having been compared to an injection. The inadequate medical aftercare and physical and mental damage resulting from the surgery effectively ended her career. She returned to the track at the 2017 Ugandan Championships but completed the 1500 metres in 5:06.18 – nearly a minute below her best and a time which ranked her as a club level runner rather than an elite athlete.

International competitions

National titles
Ugandan Athletics Championships
800 m: 2011
1500 m: 2009, 2011

See also
Index of Uganda-related articles
List of Young Achievers Award winners
List of African Games medalists in athletics (women)

References

External links

1992 births
Living people
People from Iganga District
Ugandan female middle-distance runners
Commonwealth Games competitors for Uganda
Athletes (track and field) at the 2010 Commonwealth Games
African Games gold medalists for Uganda
African Games medalists in athletics (track and field)
Athletes (track and field) at the 2011 All-Africa Games
World Athletics Championships athletes for Uganda
Intersex sportspeople
Intersex women
21st-century LGBT people